The second season of Chuck contains 22 episodes and was originally aired from September 29, 2008 to April 27, 2009. The season continues to focus on Chuck's constant struggle to keep his spy life and real life apart as he becomes more accustomed to being a spy. More background on the Intersect project is revealed. Fulcrum, a hostile espionage organization that covets the Intersect, is featured more heavily as the season's main antagonist. Chuck and Sarah continue to grow closer, complicating their asset-handler relationship.

Cast and characters

Main cast 
 Zachary Levi as Charles "Chuck" Bartowski (22 episodes)
 Yvonne Strahovski as Agent Sarah Walker (22 episodes)
 Joshua Gomez as Morgan Grimes (22 episodes)
 Ryan McPartlin as Dr. Devon "Captain Awesome" Woodcomb (17 episodes)
 Mark Christopher Lawrence as Michael "Big Mike" Tucker (18 episodes)
 Julia Ling as Anna Wu (14 episodes)
 Scott Krinsky as Jeffrey "Jeff" Barnes (22 episodes)
 Vik Sahay as Lester Patel (22 episodes)
 Sarah Lancaster as Dr. Eleanor "Ellie" Bartowski (18 episodes)
 Adam Baldwin as Major John Casey (22 episodes)

Supporting cast 
 Bonita Friedericy as Brigadier General Diane Beckman (22 episodes)
 Tony Hale as Emmett Milbarge (14 episodes)
 Jordana Brewster as Jill Roberts (4 episodes)
 Matthew Bomer as Bryce Larkin (3 episodes)
 Chevy Chase as Ted Roark (3 episodes)
 Scott Bakula as Stephen J. Bartowski (3 episodes)
 Arnold Vosloo as Vincent Smith (3 episodes)
 Jonathan Cake as Cole Barker (2 episodes)
 Tony Todd as CIA Director Langston Graham (2 episodes)
 Patricia Rae as Bolonia Tucker (3 episodes)

Episodes

Reception 
The second season of Chuck  averaged on 7.36 million viewers per episode.

UK BARB ratings

Home media release

Notes

References

External links 
 
 

 
2009 American television seasons
2008 American television seasons